Oadis Vaughn Swigart (February 13, 1915 – August 8, 1997) was a professional baseball player.  He was a right-handed pitcher over parts of two seasons (1939–40) with the Pittsburgh Pirates. For his career, he compiled a 1–3 record, with a 4.44 earned run average, and 17 strikeouts in 46 innings pitched.

Swigart served 5 years in the army during World War II.

Swigart was born in Archie, Missouri, and died in St. Joseph, Missouri, at the age of 82.

References

External links

1915 births
1997 deaths
People from Cass County, Missouri
Military personnel from Missouri
Baseball players from Missouri
Pittsburgh Pirates players
Major League Baseball pitchers
Jackson Mississippians players
Oklahoma City Indians players
Kilgore Braves players
Davenport Blue Sox players
Montreal Royals players
Knoxville Smokies players
Syracuse Chiefs players
Birmingham Barons players
United States Army personnel of World War II